Florent-Joseph Bureau (1906–1999) was a Belgian mathematician. He was a professor at the University of Liège. He worked on algebraic and differential geometry and the theory of analytical functions. In 1952, he was awarded the Francqui Prize on Exact Sciences.

Academic staff of the University of Liège
20th-century Belgian mathematicians
Walloon people
1906 births
1999 deaths